Spark is the debut studio album of American country music singer Drake White. It was released on August 19, 2016 via Dot Records, an imprint of Big Machine Records. The album has produced three singles, "It Feels Good", Livin' the Dream" and "Makin' Me Look Good Again", all of which have reached the Top 40 on the Billboard Country Airplay chart. White co-wrote eleven of the album's twelve tracks.

Ross Copperman and Jeremy Stover produced all tracks except for track 10, with assistance from White on tracks 3, 6, 7, and 8. Andrew Petroff and Adam Schwind produced track 10.

Commercial reception

The album debuted at No. 34 on Billboard 200, and No. 4 on the Top Country Albums chart, selling 11,000 copies in its first week. It has sold 58,900 copies in the US as of September 2017.

Track listing

Personnel
Musicians

 Jon Aanestad – harmonica
 Joe Andrews – electric guitar
 Paul Armstrong – trumpet
 Zac Brown – background vocals 
 Clay Cook – background vocals 
 Ross Copperman – acoustic guitar, electric guitar, keyboards, background vocals 
 Sam Damewood – fiddle
 Jimmy de Martini – background vocals 
 Kris Donegan – electric guitar
 Fred Eltringham – drums
 Shannon Forrest – drums
 Mark Hill – bass guitar
 John Driskell Hopkins – background vocals 
 Carolyn Dawn Johnson – background vocals 
 Jaren Johnston – background vocals 
 Jason Lehning – keyboards
 Tony Lucido – bass guitar
 Matt McDaniel – banjo, acoustic guitar, electric guitar, keyboards, electric sitar
 Miles McPherson – drums
 Jimmy Nichols – keyboards 
 Billy Nobel – keyboards
 Phillip Pence – bass guitar, acoustic guitar, ukulele
 Andrew Petroff – percussion
 Ethan Pilzer – bass guitar
 Danny Rader – banjo, acoustic guitar, electric guitar, mandolin
 Mike Rojas – keyboards 
 Adam Schwind – drums, percussion, background vocals 
 Carlos Sosa – saxophone
 Dawn Soul – tambourine
 Russell Terrell – background vocals 
 Ilya Toshinsky – acoustic guitar, electric guitar
 Raúl Vallejo – trombone
 Derek Wells – acoustic guitar, electric guitar
 Drake White – lead vocals

Production

 Natthaphol Abhigantaphand – production assistant
 Daniel Bacigalupi – production assistant
 Joe Baldridge –  engineer
 Adam Bokesch – production assistant
 Drew Bollman – production assistant
 Ross Copperman – digital editing, engineer, producer, programming
 Paul Cossette – production assistant
 Andrew Darby – production assistant
 Brian David – digital editing
 Steve Dewey – production assistant
 Angella Grossi – production assistant
 Bob Holland – engineer mixing
 Travis Humbert – production assistant
 Scott Johnson – production coordination
 Allison Jones – A&R
 Laurel Kittleson – production coordination
 Jason Kyle – engineer
 Nick Lane – engineer
 Jasper Lemaster – production assistant, engineer
 Andrew Mendelson – mastering
 Buckley Miller – engineer, mixing
 Justin Niebank – mixing
 Andrew Petroff – engineer, producer
 Richard Ridgell – production assistant
 Lindsay Rimes – programming
 Adam Schwind – producer
 Reid Shippen – engineer, mixing
 Brianna Steinitz – production coordination
 Jeremy Stover – producer
 Drake White – producer
 Chris Wilkinson – production assistant

Chart performance

Album

Weekly charts

Year-end charts

References

2016 debut albums
Drake White albums
Dot Records albums
Big Machine Records albums
Albums produced by Jeremy Stover